Mary Louise Barratt Due (9 April 1888 in Bergen, Norway – 24 December 1969 in Oslo, Norway) was known as one of the most influential Norwegian pianists in the 20th century. She was the daughter of the preacher Thomas Ball Barratt, and the mother to the musicians Stephan Henrik Barratt-Due and Esther Barratt-Due. In 1916 she married the violinist Henrik Adam Due, and together they founded the Barratt Due Institute of Music in 1927.

Biography 
Barratt Due was born in Bergen, but the family moved the following year to Kristiania, where her father was a minister in the Methodist Church. Growing up in Grünerløkka was happy, in a home harmonious and full of music. Both parents played and sang, and her father's daily morning devotions attended all the family in the song. Barratt Due received piano lessons at an early age. 10 years old, she got an exemption from the age limit and attended the Oslo Musikkonservatorium, despite the fact that the age limit was 12 years. With a scholarship, she traveled 14-year-old to Rome, Italy to study at the traditional St. Cecilia Academy. Here she spent six years in an international and exuberant musical environment, where also the theory and language were part of the curriculum, and in 1906 she made her debut in Oslo, and in 1907 she took diploma exam in Italy.

As a teacher of piano, she composer, pianist and Liszt pupil Giovanni Sgambati. Through him she had firsthand knowledge of the interpretation of Liszt and Chopin, who would later become her favorite composers. 1906 she made her debut in Kristiania with rave reviews. Back in Rome she completed her graduation Diploma Musica in 1907 and gave several concerts. She had an extensive performing beside teaching at the institute. Favorite composers were Franz Liszt and Frederic Chopin. She was also open for the new Impressionism style, and was among the first in Norway to put Claude Debussy on the schedule. She released Norsk pianoskole in 1931, together with the composer Eyvind Alnæs, and was president of the Soroptimist movement from 1948.

Publications 
1931: Norsk Pianoskole together with Eyvind Alnæs 
1957: Musikkinntrykk fra Amerika, chronicle in Aftenposten 15 April 1957

References

External links 
Mary Louise Barratt Due at Oslobilder

1888 births
1969 deaths
Norwegian classical pianists
Musicians from Oslo
Academic staff of the Barratt Due Institute of Music
Norwegian people of English descent
People of Cornish descent
20th-century classical pianists
Women classical pianists